Lyceum Kennedy International School is an international school located in New York City, located in two buildings in Midtown Manhattan. It serves preschool through grade 12.

The school was named after President of the United States John F. Kennedy. Founded in 1964, Lyceum Kennedy French American school serves the needs of French and francophone families living in New York.

It has a French language K-12 day school program, and it has a Japanese language preschool and Saturday school program.

History

Éliane Dumas, a teacher at the Lycée Français de New York, established the Lyceum Kennedy French American School in 1964. Dumas established the school for French students, and the school used the New York regent standards so the students may easily move on to American schools.

A Japan-born linguist and professor named Koji Sonoda acquired the school in 1986. In 1987 the school had opened its Japanese kindergarten and elementary school program in the Ardsley campus. The school website stated that the Ardsley campus opened in 1996. The Manhattan Japanese program, with a supplementary school and a preschool, opened in 1997, and the Japanese junior high supplementary school program began in 2010. It previously had a Japanese day elementary school, but that closed in 2004.

The school previously had a second campus in Ardsley, New York. In 2015 Lyceum Kennedy had two programs: A French-English bilingual program at both campuses, and a program for Japanese people only at the Manhattan campus. The Japanese program was previously called the Lyceum Kennedy Japanese School (リセ・ケネディ日本人学校 Rise Kenedi Nihonjin Gakkō).

Previously the French program was only in Manhattan.

Accreditation
Lyceum Kennedy French American School is accredited by the French Ministry of Education. Lyceum Kennedy students can transfer easily into any French school in France.

In September 2014, Lyceum Kennedy became an authorized International Baccalaureate school for IB Diploma Programme. The school offers to students in 11th and 12th grades a bilingual French and English IB Diploma, with Spanish as the second language.

Admissions
Admission to Lyceum Kennedy is selective and is based on factors which include previous school performance, teacher recommendations, discovery days, commitment to bilingual education, and behavior.

Lyceum Kennedy French American School enrolls students without regard to race, religion, color, creed, gender, sexual orientation and national, social or ethnic origin and affords its students all rights, privileges, programs and activities generally made available to all students at the school.

Demographics
 about 33% of the school's population spoke a home language other than English and French and over 50% of the school's elementary students were non-French-speakers prior to enrolling at Lyceum Kennedy.

Tuition
, annual tuition at Lyceum Kennedy ranges from $17,660 for Preschool students, to $34,500 for its final year students in Manhattan.

See also
 Agency for French Education Abroad (Agence pour l'enseignement français à l'étranger or AEFE)
 New York State Board of Regents
 International Baccalaureate
 IB Diploma Programme
 Japanese in New York City
 American School of Paris, American international school in France
 American School in Japan, American international school in Tokyo

References

External links

 Lyceum Kennedy
  Lyceum Kennedy
  Lyceum Kennedy

French-American culture in New York (state)
Japanese-American culture in New York (state)
Private K-12 schools in Manhattan
Private elementary schools in Westchester County, New York
French international schools in the United States
Japanese international schools in the United States
Educational institutions established in 1964
1964 establishments in New York (state)